(from Latin "in the year of the world"), abbreviated as AM or A.M., or Year After Creation, is a  calendar era based on the biblical accounts of the creation of the world and subsequent history. Two such calendar eras have seen notable use historically:

 Since the Middle Ages, the Hebrew calendar has been based on rabbinic calculations of the year of creation from the Hebrew Masoretic Text of the Bible. This calendar is used within Jewish communities for religious purposes and is one of two official calendars in Israel. In the Hebrew calendar, the day begins at sunset. The calendar's epoch, corresponding to the calculated date of the world's creation, is equivalent to sunset on the Julian proleptic calendar date 6 October 3761 BC. The new year begins at Rosh Hashanah, in Tishrei.  5783 (meaning the 5,783rd year since the creation of the world) began at sunset on 25 September 2022 according to the Gregorian calendar.
The Byzantine calendar was used  in the Eastern Roman Empire and many Christian Orthodox countries and Eastern Orthodox Churches and was based on the Septuagint text of the Bible. That calendar is similar to the Julian calendar except that its reference date is equivalent to 1 September 5509 BC on the Julian proleptic calendar. 

While both calendars reputedly counted the number of years since the creation of the world, the primary reason for their disparity lies in which underlying biblical text is chosen (the Earth seems to have been created roughly around 5500 BC based on the Greek Septuagint text, and about 3760 BC based on the Hebrew Masoretic text). Most of the 1,732-year difference resides in numerical discrepancies in the genealogies of the two versions of the Book of Genesis. Patriarchs from Adam to Terah, the father of Abraham, are said to be older by as much as 100 years or more when they begat their named son in the Greek Septuagint than they were in the Latin Vulgate, or the Hebrew Tanakh. The net difference between the two major genealogies of Genesis is 1,466 years (ignoring the "second year after the flood" ambiguity), 85% of the total difference. (See Dating creation.)

There are also discrepancies between methods of dating based on the text of the Bible vs. modern academic dating of landmark events used to calibrate year counts, such as the destruction of the First Temple—see Missing years (Jewish calendar).

Jewish tradition

During the Talmudic era, from the 1st to the 10th centuries CE (38th - 48th centuries AM), the center of the Jewish world was in the Middle East, primarily in the Talmudic Academies in Babylonia and Syria Palaestina. Jews in these regions used Seleucid Era dating (also known as the "Anno Graecorum (AG)" or the "Era of Contracts") as the primary method for calculating the calendar year. For example, the writings of Josephus and the Books of the Maccabees used Seleucid Era dating exclusively, and the Talmud tractate Avodah Zarah states:

Other epochs: 3760 BCE
Occasionally in Talmudic writings, reference was made to other starting points for eras, such as Destruction Era dating, being the number of years since the 70 CE destruction of the Second Temple, and the number of years since the Creation year based on the calculation in the Seder Olam Rabbah of Rabbi Jose ben Halafta in about 160 CE. By his calculation, based on the Masoretic Text, Adam and Eve were created on 1st of Tishrei (Rosh Hashanah Day 1) in 3760 BCE, later confirmed by the Muslim chronologist al-Biruni as 3,448 years before the Seleucid era. An example is the c. 8th-century CE Baraita of Samuel.

In the 8th and 9th centuries CE, the center of Jewish life moved from Babylonia to Europe, so calculations from the Seleucid era "became meaningless". From the 11th century, anno mundi dating became dominant throughout most of the world's Jewish communities, replacing the Seleucid dating system. The new system reached its definitive form in 1178 when Maimonides completed the Mishneh Torah. In the section Sanctification of the Moon (11.16), he wrote of his choice of Epoch, from which calculations of all dates should be made, as "the third day of Nisan in this present year ... which is the year 4938 of the creation of the world" (22 March 1178). He included all the rules for the calculated calendar epoch and their scriptural basis, including the modern epochal year in his work, and establishing the final formal usage of the anno mundi era.

The first year of the Jewish calendar, Anno Mundi 1 (AM 1), began about one year before creation, so that year is also called the Year of emptiness. The first five days of Jewish creation week occupy the last five days of AM 1, Elul 25–29. The sixth day of creation, when Adam and Eve were created, is the first day of AM 2, Rosh Hashanah (1 Tishrei). Its associated molad Adam (molad VaYaD) occurred on Day 6 (yom Vav) at 14 (Yud Daled) hours (and 0 parts). A year earlier, the first day of AM 1, Rosh Hashanah (1 Tishrei), is associated with molad tohu (new moon of chaos), so named because it occurred before creation when everything was still chaotic—it is also translated as the new moon of nothing. This is also called molad BaHaRaD, because it occurred on Day 2 (yom Beis), 5 (Hei) hours, 204 (Reish Daled) parts (11:11:20 pm). Because this is just before midnight when the Western day begins, but after 6 pm when the Jewish calendrical day begins (equivalent to the next tabular day with the same daylight period), its Julian calendar date is 6–7 October 3761 BCE (Gregorian: 6–7 September 3761 BCE or −3760).

Greek tradition

The Septuagint  was the most scholarly non-Hebrew version of the Old Testament available to early Christians. Many converts already spoke Greek, and it was readily adopted as the preferred vernacular-language rendering for the eastern Roman Empire. The later Latin translation called the Vulgate, an interpretative translation from Hebrew and other Greek sources, replaced it in the west after its completion by St. Jerome c. 405, Latin being the most common vernacular language in those regions.

Earliest Christian chronology
The earliest extant Christian writings on the age of the world according to the biblical chronology were therefore based on the Septuagint, due to its early availability. They can be found in the Apology to Autolycus (Apologia ad Autolycum) by Theophilus (AD 115–181), the sixth bishop of Antioch, and the Five Books of Chronology by Sextus Julius Africanus (AD 200–245).

Theophilus presents a detailed chronology "from the foundation of the world" to emperor Marcus Aurelius. His chronology begins with the biblical first man Adam through to emperor Marcus Aurelius, in whose reign Theophilus lived. The chronology puts the creation of the world at about 5529 BC: "All the years from the creation of the world amount to a total of 5,698 years." No mention of Jesus is made in his chronology.

Dr. Ben Zion Wacholder points out that the writings of the Church Fathers on this subject are of vital significance (even though he disagrees with their chronological system based on the authenticity of the Septuagint, as compared to that of the Hebrew text), in that through the Christian chronographers a window to the earlier Hellenistic biblical chronographers is preserved:

The Chronicon of Eusebius (early 4th century) and Jerome (c. 380, Constantinople) dated creation to 5199 BC. Earlier editions of the Roman Martyrology for Christmas Day used this date, as did the Irish Annals of the Four Masters.

Alexandrian era

The Alexandrian era, which was conceived and calculated in AD 412, was the precursor to the use of the Byzantine era. After the initial attempts of Hippolytus, Clement of Alexandria, and others the Alexandrian computation of the date of creation was calculated to be 25 March 5493 BC.

The Alexandrian monk Panodorus reckoned 5,904 years from Adam to AD 412. His years began on 29 August, which corresponded to the First of Thoth, the first day of the Egyptian calendar. Annianus of Alexandria, however, preferred the Annunciation style for New Year's Day, i. e., 25 March, and shifted Panodorus' era by circa six months to begin on 25 March. This created the Alexandrian era, whose first day was the first day of the proleptic Alexandrian civil year in progress, 29 August 5493 BC, with the ecclesiastical year beginning on 25 March 5493 BC.

Dionysius of Alexandria had earlier emphatically quoted mystical justifications for the choice of 25 March as the beginning of the year:

Church fathers such as Maximus the Confessor and Theophanes the Confessor, and chroniclers such as George Syncellus adopted the Alexandrian Era of 25 March 5493 BC. Its striking mysticism made it popular in Byzantium, especially in monasteries. However, this masterpiece of Christian symbolism had two grave problems, namely historical inaccuracy regarding the date of the Resurrection as determined by its Easter computus, and its contradiction of the chronology of the Gospel of Saint John regarding the date of the Crucifixion on Friday after the Passover.

Chronicon Paschale
A new variant of the World Era was suggested in the Chronicon Paschale, a valuable Byzantine universal chronicle of the world, composed about the year AD 630 by some representative of the Antiochian scholarly tradition. It dates the creation of Adam to 21 March 5507 BC.

For its influence on Greek Christian chronology, and also because of its wide scope, the Chronicon Paschale takes its place beside Eusebius, and the chronicle of the monk Georgius Syncellus which was so important in the Middle Ages; but in respect of form it is inferior to these works.

Adoption of Byzantine era
The Byzantine Anno Mundi era was the official calendar of the Eastern Orthodox Church from c. AD 691 to 1728 in the Ecumenical Patriarchate. By the late 10th century the Byzantine era, which had become fixed at 1 September 5509 BC since at least the mid-7th century (differing by 16 years from the Alexandrian date, and by 2 years from the Chronicon Paschale), had become the widely accepted calendar by Chalcedonian Christianity. The Byzantine era was used as the civil calendar by the Byzantine Empire from AD 988 to 1453, and by Russia from c. AD 988 to 1700.

The computation was derived from the Septuagint version of the Bible, and placed the date of creation at 5509 years before the Incarnation, which was later taken to mean 5509 BC when conversions to the Christian era were desired. With a new year date of September 1, which coincides with the beginning of the Orthodox liturgical year, its epoch became 1 September 5509 BC (Julian), and year AM 1 thus lasted until 31 August 5508 BC. The "year of creation" was generally expressed in Greek in the Byzantine calendar as Etos Kosmou, literally "year of the universe".

Western church
Western Christianity never fully adopted an Anno Mundi epoch system, and did not at first produce chronologies based on the Vulgate that were in contrast to the Eastern calculations from the Septuagint. Since the Vulgate was not completed until only a few years before the sack of Rome by the Goths, there was little time for such developments before the political upheavals that followed in the West. Whatever the reasons, the West eventually came to rely instead on the independently developed Anno Domini (AD) epoch system. AM dating did continue to be of interest for liturgical reasons; however, since it was of direct relevance to the calculation of the Nativity of Jesus (AM 5197–5199) and the Passion of Christ (AM 5228–5231). For example, Bede in his World-Chronicle (Chapter 66 of his De Temporum Ratione, On the Reckoning of Time), dated all events using an epoch he derived from the Vulgate which set the birth of Christ as AM 3952.  In his Letter to Plegwin, Bede explained the difference between the two epochs.

In popular culture 
In 1990, heavy metal band Black Sabbath wrote and recorded the song "Anno Mundi" for the opening track of Tyr, their fifteenth studio album. Drawing parallels between the creation of the world and the present day, vocalist Tony Martin has elaborated on the inspiration behind it: "In the year of the world, people are all trying to save the planet, or they say they are trying to save the planet, but really it’s just talk and everything carries on the same until the world destructs. Almost every line is a question, to which there is an answer, but like a questionnaire, everybody’s answer will be different", he wrote.

See also
 Anno Lucis
 Chronology of the Bible
 Dating creation
 Epoch (reference date)

References

Notes

Citations

Sources

Byzantine calendar
Calendar eras
Hebrew calendar
Latin words and phrases